List of Automotive Manufacturing Plants in various States of India.

References

 
Vehicle
Vehicle
India
Vehicle plants